Cinta Fitri (Fitri's Love) is an Indonesian soap opera television series. Spanning 7 seasons and 1,002 episodes, the series was produced by MD Entertainment headed by Manoj Punjabi and Dhamoo Punjabi. It aired at 20:30 on SCTV from 2 April 2007 until 28 November 2010. The show moved to Indosiar on 11 January 2011 and aired until 8 May 2011. This series gained high viewership, both domestic and overseas (Singapore, Malaysia and Brunei).

Cast
Shireen Sungkar as Fitri Rahayu
Teuku Wisnu as Farrel Emeraldy Hutama
Adly Fairuz as Aldo
Donita as Moza
Dinda Kanyadewi as Mischa
Louise Anastasya as Sita
Shandy Syarif as Faiz
Verlita Evelyn as Maya
Iqbal Pakula as Bram
Nuri Maulida as Kayla
Lian Firman as Hadi
Dea Lestari as Rita
Irene Librawati as Lia
Ochie Anggraini as Pinkan
Meidiana Hutomo as Lik Rini
Ayu Dyah Pasha as Asifa
Sylvia Fully as Rita
Rama Michael as Ferdi
Ersya Aurelia as Fika
Bemby Putuanda as Norman
Elsye Virgita as Salsa (Seasons 2 - Seasons 3, Seasons 7)
Shenny Andrea as Sherly (Season 1 - Seasons 7)
Windy Wulandari as Senny (Seasons 4 - Seasons 6, Seasons 7)
Arthur Tobing as Iman
Bobby Rakhman as Cecep
Djalu as Koko
Hendrik Beta as Beta (Seasons 6)
Celia Nadia Agatha Thomas as Nadine adult character (Seasons 7)
Cahya Rizky Zaputra as Raffa adult character (Seasons 7)
Wesley Andrew as Rifky adult character (Seasons 7)
Gaxel Anyndra Shanie as Aliza adult character (Seasons 7)
Didit Aditya as Alif adult character (Seasons 7)
Suheil Fahmi Bisyir as Arya adult character (Seasons 7)
Rio Bhaskara as Yuga adult character (Seasons 7)
Marsha Aruan as Abel adult character (Seasons 7)
Akri Patrio as Babe Marzuki (Seasons 7)
Omaswati as Enyak Marzuki (Seasons 7)
Raffa Nemaja as Raffa child character (Seasons 4 - Seasons 7)
Anbo Ontocheno as Yuga child character (Seasons 1 - Seasons 7)
Angelina Quartiana as Abel child character (Seasons 2 - Seasons 7)
Chilla Irawan as Nadine child character (Seasons 1 - Seasons 3, Seasons 5, Seasons 7)
Fabian as Alif child character (Seasons 1 - Seasons 7)
Hans Joshua as Anwar (Seasons 6)
Lyra Virna as Mariska (Seasons 6)
Teuku Ryan as Hartawan (Seasons 4 - Seasons 6)
Rini Yulianti as Joana (Seasons 6)
Yoppie Beda as Herman (Seasons 6)
Addy Irwandi as Giman (Seasons 6)
Ferdi Ali as Randy (Seasons 6)
Ida Kusumah as Oma (Seasons 1 - Seasons 6)
Boy Tirayoh as Hutama (Seasons 1 - Seasons 3, Seasons 7 episodes 105)
El Manik as Handoko (Seasons 5 - Seasons 6)
Randy Pangalila as Tristan (Seasons 1, Seasons 3 - Seasons 4)
Silvana Herman as Doli (Seasons 4)
Rizky Hanggono as Firman (Seasons 1)
Metha Yunatria as Nabila (Seasons 1)
Fanny Ghassani as Kayla first character (Seasons 1 - Seasons 2)
Debby Cynthia Dewi as Aish (Seasons 1 - Seasons 4)
Revand Narya as Fathan (Yadi) (Seasons 5)
Jonathan Frizzy as Hendry (Erwin) (Seasons 5)
Ajeng Kartika as Diana (Seasons 4)
Nurul Hidayati as Dinita (Seasons 3 - Seasons 4)
Restu Sinaga as Binsar (Seasons 5)
Indah Ayu Putri as Angel (Seasons 5 - Seasons 6)
Afdhal Yusman as Iman (Seasons 5)
Marizcha Fayn as Jamilah (Seasons 3)
Andrew Andika as Vino (Seasons 2)
Mike Lewis as Edo (Seasons 1 - Seasons 2)

International broadcasts

Synopsis

Season 1
Fitri is a countryside girl who is naive, old-fashioned, cheerful, kind-hearted and far from being judgemental towards others. She came from a place called Wonogiri and lived with her aunt, as her parents had long died. She had a relationship with a man named Firman, a man who came from Jakarta, the capital city of Indonesia.

As her wedding with Firman was drawing near, Fitri came to Jakarta to meet Firman's family. But as soon as she arrives in Jakarta, she is informed about Firman's death. So instead of attending her own wedding, she attends her fiancé's funeral. But that didn't deter Fitri. Fitri decided to stay in Jakarta, but she told Firman's family that she's going back to her village.

Fitri is shy, which was why she didn't tell Firman's family the truth. The other reason why she chooses to stay in Jakarta is to not let down her aunt. As if Fitri was blessed with unluckiness, her wallet was stolen at the bus station when she was wondering where to go next.

Fortunately, Fitri gets a job at a Soto and Rice food stall owned by Maya, a woman who was kicked out by her own father, Mr. Hutama, a very successful and wealthy businessman. The main reason was for marrying Bram, a man who was poor but hardworking who was not acknowledged by his father.

Moza is the daughter of Mr. Hutama's late best friend. Because of this, Mr. Hutama is hoping to see his son, Farrel, to marry Moza someday. Farrel himself is not up for another relationship especially after the departure of his ex-girlfriend, Mischa, to study abroad. Farrel then met Fitri. After various incidents, the relationship between Farrel and Fitri slowly building, but the jealous and scheming Moza kept on disrupting the relationship between the two. Hence, Farrel must choose between Fitri or his family business.

Farrel convinced Moza there's nothing between him and Fitri. But just when everything started to cool down, Mischa returned. Farrel then again was forced to choose between these two women. Alas, Farrel chose to be with Fitri instead. They became one of the most enviable couples for those around.

Season 2
After Fitri fell at a bridge in Wonogiri, Farrel and their family panicked. Bulik Rini was also agitated, but luckily Fitri was safe and was found by some villagers. The wedding party was held with joy. Since they lived together, conflict between in-laws automatically appeared. Grandma was always provoking Lia, as a result, Fitri and Lia often has conflicts. Aldo and Kayla's conflict also heated up, Aldo was assumed too busy taking care of his parents and Norman. The household life of Maya and Bram was also a dead end. Their decision of working together in one office, at Emil's property agency, became a boomerang. At the moment, Maya and Bram kept their husband and wife status a secret. And Emil not knowingly, ends up liking Maya.

Moza also has a story. Vino who is prideful, is the new working partner at Retro, this makes Moza irritated. Vino's cynical attitude towards women is caused by his past of bad experiences with romance. They fight frequently. Many people thought Vino will end up with Moza. Fate says differently. Moza is destined to be with Aldo. Norman and Yuga had rented a house. Yuga was happy to meet Nabila again who is now a teacher in the school.

Season 3
While Fitri became pregnant, Farrel was jailed accused of murdering Bram. Hutama and Lia are shocked, but not Maya, who filed for this case. Alas, Farrel was free; however Mischa provoked Maya to get inheritance from Hutama using Alif as an excuse. Maya succeeded in her provocation and she took over her father's wealth. This made Hutama, Lia, and Oma even unhappier. They moved to Fitri and Farrel's rented house and were pleased there. Unexpectedly, Kayla got into a coma donating her bone marrow for Finza. Hadi changed towards Aldo and Moza who were then married. A cold war between them was unavoidable.

One day, Fitri was shocked to see Bram in a public place. Everyone thought that Fitri was hallucinating. Mischa found a new partner through Bram's disappearance to attack Fitri and Farrel's happiness, Faiz claimed to be Hutama's only true son. Not Farrel. Hutama's entire family was in shock.

Season 4, Ramadhan 1
Through the hardest and longest struggle, Farrel and Fitri's son was delivered safely. Farrel asks Mrs. Lia to name their son because Mrs. Lia is his most beloved and respected mother. Mrs. Lia was overwhelmed with the given honour, she named Farrel and Fitri's son, Raffa Emeraldi Hutama.

Mrs. Lia reminds Farrel of Mr. Hutama's last wishes before he died, to protect his family and the company, Retro, from anything and anyone. Farrel and Fitri are in no position to refuse this. Mischa and Faiz were surprised to see the return of Farrel, Fitri, and Oma. Moreover, Mrs. Lia asks Farrel to return to work at Retro.

In the meantime, Bram managed to get hold of the CCTV master video and witnessed how Mr. Hutama died. Bram has always been looked down by Mischa and Faiz. So when he found it was them who killed Mr. Hutama, Bram selfishly uses the opportunity to threaten both to get what he wants instead of handing them to the authority.

Tristan kidnaps Moza from Aldo while they were on a holiday in a villa. Aldo had searched for Moza everywhere but he still could not find her for a while. When Aldo had found Moza, she had already become Tristan's wife.

So how will Farrel and Fitri know and finally get Mischa and Faiz to confess that they killed Mr. Hutama? Will Mischa and Faiz ever leave Fitri, Farrel, and Raffa alone and let them live happily? What exactly happened to Aldo and Moza? How's the relationship going between Maya and Bram?

Season 5
Lia is trapped under the debris of the hotel after an earthquake rocks Yogyakarta. This unlucky event happens just after the secret that Faiz is not her real son was revealed. Lia is badly injured and she is hanging on for dear life. Mischa and Faiz are afraid and make use of this disastrous situation to run away.

Farrel is very anxious and nervous when Lia finishes talking and hangs up the phone from there. He gets this uneasy feeling in his heart. And it turns out to be right because not long after that Farrel gets the news about the earthquake in Yogyakarta. Farrel panics and worries, even more so as he cannot get in touch with his mother. He immediately decides to go to Yogyakarta as he feels that Lia is in danger and needs help.

Oma is shocked and is hospitalized after she hears the news about the earthquake and Lia being trapped in this national calamity. The entire family cries and pray to God to help save Lia and Oma.

Meanwhile, Mischa continues trying to ascertain Lia's condition, hoping for her death. Faiz asks and even forces her to run away but she insists that she will not leave Yogyakarta before knowing for sure if Lia is dead. Farrel arrives in Yogyakarta, and after a great deal of difficulty, finds a body resembling Lia. At that exact moment, Faiz sees this and thinks that the body Farrel is looking at is Lia's body; he immediately informs Mischa, who is overjoyed and finally agrees to return to Jakarta. Mischa and Faiz are wrong: Lia is still alive under the debris of the hotel, and Farrel finally succeeds in rescuing her. Unaware of this, Faiz and Mischa are surprised when Farrel brings Lia home in an unconscious state. Back in Jakarta, Lia's condition worsens and she goes into a coma. The truth about Mischa lying about Faiz which had to be spoken about did not happen. Mischa does not sit and wait: she tries to kill Lia at the hospital. During her attempt, Mischa almost succeeds when suddenly Lia awakens from her coma. Mischa is very scared and tries to escape but she is caught. Farrel's temper shoots up when he hears the story from Lia, and Mischa and Faiz are finally taken by the police. As the court case goes on, Mischa and Faiz are charged with fraud, attempted homicide and murder.

After the arrest, happiness returns to the family, but Bram and Maya's household is getting worse. Handoko, the brother of the late Hutama, appears and intends to destroy the happiness of the family. Lia and Hutama hate Handoko, because he once made Hutama's secretary, Asifa, have an affair with Hutama. Since then Handoko would not be regarded as a family.

Mischa gives birth to her son in jail, which, afterwards, was under the care of the Hutama family. Hutama had left a DVD for Fitri at the bank. It turns out Asifa really had an affair and have children of Hutama. Hutama pleaded Fitri to find the boy. Handoko also see the DVD. Asifa turned out to be in Jakarta. Handoko starts to find out about the boy by asking Asifa.

After investigation, it turns out the child Asifa and Hutama is Faiz. Handoko told Asifa and Asifa also intends to help her son, Faiz to get out of jail. Faiz and Mischa get out of jail. Faiz then hates Mischa after knowing that he had killed his own father.

Mischa still wants to destroy the happiness of Family Hutama and cooperate with Handoko. But Faiz and Asifa ignored this. Faiz becomes good and is willing to set up a company and does not interfere with the family's happiness.

All is changed when Fahmi, Faiz and Mischa's child is involved in a car accident. The car involved belongs to Farell, but someone had stolen the car. Faiz and Mischa are very sad and both promise to take revenge on his son's death. Faiz and Mischa demand Farell to be imprisoned and severely punished. On the other hand, the Hutama family who believe that Farrell not guilty, try to free Farrell. Mischa later learned that Handoko killed Fahmi. He became angry and would not cooperate again with Handoko. But after Handoko pleaded, Mischa finally agreed.

All the witnesses and the evidence held by Mischa. Mischa offer evidence to freedom Farrell but will lose ownership Retro and Metro. The Hutama family agrees. Farrell is freed and upon learning that, he was furious, and aims to establish a new company. All Retro workers who do not cooperate with Mischa, resign from Retro and joins Farrell's company. Revolution, Farrell's company, becomes competition for Retro. Mischa and Faiz try to impose Farrell with Revolution. Farrell sent Bram to spy Mischa.

Handoko and Mischa's cooperation was almost revealed, but Mischa makes Hartawan the cause of the problem. Maya and Bram's relation is almost toward divorce. Fitri is pregnant again. Mischa is not willing to try to kill Fitri's new son. Faiz, who feels unfair because Fitri becomes pregnant while her son died, helps Mischa in the effort to kill the child.

Bram is caught spying Mischa, who then slandered Bram, which made him go to jail. Maya is angry with Farrel and does not allow Farell to meet Raffa before Bram is freed. Efforts to frighten Mischa for admit the truth about Fahmi and Faiz fails.

Fitri finally helps, and succeeds to reveal the truth about Faiz, and Faiz intends to help the Hutama family. Farrel and Faiz cooperation has a result. Tino, Mischa's messenger was arrested, and Farell upon knowing Handoko's bad intentions, is pushed off a cliff by Handoko. Mischa tries not to be sad, although her loved one has died. Fitri, who is still grieving awakens and becomes the leader of Revolution.

Apparently, Farrel is still alive, helped by Mischa and kept in a house. Farrel is conscious but suffers amnesia. But after all, crime will not be eternal. Sure enough, Mischa's efforts to hide Farrel is known. The Hutama family find Farrel. But unfortunately Fitri has to sacrifice for Farell. Farrel would die if he tried to remember his past.

Once again Mischa enters the Hutama household and become Farell's wife, with Fitri being a maid. Fitri once again faces the test of her love with Farrel. Fitri challenges Mischa to get Farell's heart, while Farell himself begins to remember his past.

Farrel who sees Fitri wonders. Where a Fitri's husband? Remembering Farell's effort to win the heart of Bu Lik bypretending to be Fathan, Fitri also tells Farell about Fathan. Fitri also use the name Fathan to get closer to Farrel. The situation was also exploited by Mischa.

Mischa pay Yadi to act as Fathan. Fitri, with the help of all his family, can survive against Mischa and Yadi, which are cornering. Mischa's efforts are useless. Yadi is successfully removed by Fitri with the help of Faiz, Norman, Bram, and family Hutama. Wanting to get rid of Mischa, Fitri also hires a new man, Henry, who becomes Erwin, a rich businessman from Australia.

Fitri and the family take advantage of the materialistic character of Mischa to get rid of her. He made it appear that Mischa had an affair with Henry, aka Erwin; and succeeds. Mischa is expelled from the family home by Farrel. Because Mischa has been out of the residence Hutama, Handoko would not want to clean up all this in a way to kill Farrell. Farrell has an accident on the steps of the mosque. Accused of trying to kill Farrell, Mischa blurred.

Fitri asks Handoko about Farell because she was worried about his condition. Handoko also explains that he succeeded in blocking Mischa from entering Farell's room. Mischa is upset having been slandered by Handoko. She threatens to reveal Handoko's intentions to everyone. Meanwhile, Aldo admits that Angel is having his child. Meanwhile, Moza is hysteric upon realizing that her daughter, Aliza, is not moving. Handoko threatens to kill Farrel and instead attempts unsuccessfully to kidnap him. During the action, Handoko was almost stabbed.

Season 6, Ramadhan 2
After Mischa's accidental stabbing, Fitri takes her to the hospital in an ambulance and waits for her, because she is in critical condition. Meanwhile, Farrel runs after Handoko but he manages to escape.  When Oma and Lia return home, they are unaware that Handoko is already there, determined to finish them all, and has taken Rafa hostage. Lia, Oma and Bulik confront him, and Lia informs Farrel of this situation. Police surround Handoko, who flees while Farrel chases him. Finally, just before dying, Handoko admits to all that he has done.  Meanwhile, Mischa's condition improves, but instead of being thankful upon regaining consciousness, she renews animosity by trying to take Farrel away from his home and family. Lia becomes ill from stress, and her condition worsens amid the chaos. As Mischa succeeds in overpowering Farrel, Lia dies, and the entire scene disintegrates. Maya promises to marry Hartawan after getting a divorce, but her feelings for Bram return. Amid severe illness, Kayla begins to feel useless, while Aldo is unable to help Farrel and Fitri because his daughter Aliza is critical; he can only help her if he divorces Mozza and marries Angel.

Season 7 
Oma is now no more, and the Hutama family is in mourning. Mischa returns with a vengeance: she has accidentally burnt half of her face, and needing to take out her anger on Fitri and Farrel, she comes up with a plan to kidnap Raffa. The Hutama family were reunited after Farrel's recovery from his minor paralysis. All worry because Mischa almost succeeds in entering their house, and Fitri wants to take no risks, so she finally agrees to Lia Hutama's suggestion of hiding Raffa somewhere out of the house. It turns out that Mischa continuously spies on the family and she discovers of their plan, so the Hutamas contact the police for protection, but Mischa is sly enough to avoid capture while continuing to follow Fitri. When Fitri gets a bit careless, Mischa finally succeeds in grabbing Rafka from her arms and takes him away. Meanwhile, Kayla forces Hadi to marry Rita immediately because her condition is worsening day by day. Abel finally learns of Kayla's condition and approves of Hadi marrying Rita. But after the wedding, Kayla's condition improves. As time passes, Aldo's business corporation improves. His company surpasses other companies. Automatically, Aldo's family wallow in wealth. This changes Mozza, causing her to feel all the more prestigious especially in educating Aliza, whom she pampers.

Reboot

On 20 February 2021, Manoj Punjabi announced that they will be producing a reboot version of Cinta Fitri on WeTV. With the cast like Tissa Biani and Rizky Nazar. On 15 September 2021, the first promo was released. The reboot version was broadcast from 5 October 2021 and ended on 17 November 2021.

References

Indonesian television soap operas
SCTV (TV network) original programming
Indosiar original programming
2007 Indonesian television series debuts
2011 Indonesian television series endings